Sphenophorus immunis is a species of beetle in the family Curculionidae. Because the type specimen could not be located, the name once was considered a junior synonym of Sphenophorus venatus of authors [being itself a misinterpreted name].

References

Dryophthorinae
Beetles described in 1832